Cecilia "Cissi" Östlund (born 10 January 1988) is a Swedish curler. She was skip for the Swedish team at the 2008 World Junior Curling Championships in Östersund, winning a silver medal and she was the skip of the Swedish team at the 2010 Ford World Women's Curling Championship in Swift Current, Canada, finishing fourth

In June 2010 it was announced that Östlund's team would join forces with Anette Norberg, with Östlund playing third. This team won the 2011 World Women's Curling Championship. 

Östlund would later become a skip again. She was the skip of team Sweden at the 2015 European Curling Championships. She led her rink of Sabina Kraupp, Sara Carlsson, Paulina Stein and Anna Huhta to a 5-4 record, finishing in 5th place.

While attending Karlstad University, Östlund represented the Swedish university curling team, skipped by Sara McManus at the 2015 Winter Universiade, finishing 4th. 

She joined the Margaretha Sigfridsson rink in 2016, throwing last rocks for the team.

Grand Slam record

Former Events

References

External links
 

Swedish female curlers
Living people
1988 births
World curling champions